The , commonly referred to simply as , is the organization responsible for collecting the television and radio fee from private individuals, companies and institutions in Germany.

Since 2013, every private household in Germany has been required to pay these fees, regardless of whether the household actually has the capability to receive the broadcasts themselves. Exceptions can be made for individuals with low income or health issues. The organisation collaborates with German civil registration offices to enforce the collection of the fees.

Organization 

The  is an association of administrations subject to public law and has no legal capacity. It was created by an administrative agreement.

The  is therefore not a legal entity of its own, but a part of the public broadcasting institutions. It conducts these tasks on behalf of the state broadcasting institutions.

Tasks 
The GEZ's tasks in detail were:

 Collection of licence fees (obtaining licence fees in arrears, handling of payments)
 Remission of licence fees
 Planning of licence fees
 Customer care

On December 31, 1976, 18.5 million TV sets and 20.4 million radios were registered in the Federal Republic of Germany.

Planning of licence fees 
The  has overall control over the planning of licence fee revenues from the supply of public-legal broadcasting in the Federal Republic of Germany.

Charging of licence fees
The licence fee for radio, TV and new media amounted to €18.36 per month since August 2021.

On June 9, 2010, state governors decided that Heidelberg University Professor Paul Kirchhof's model of a flat-rate household licence fee would be introduced in 2013. The model set out the collection of licence fees as a lump sum per household, regardless of the number of broadcast reception devices present, or even, if any devices are present at all. This required that the 'GEZ' be reorganised, and that broadcast licence fee commissioners are no longer be employed by state broadcasting institutions. The monthly fee per household became the amount previously payable for television reception. Fee payers who previously only registered a radio or a "novel broadcast reception device" but no TV set, saw their licence fee increase by 212% (from €5.76 to €17.98), however households which previously had to pay multiple licence fees started to pay less.

Since 1 January 2013, the exemption for people with disabilities was replaced by a one-third fee. Under the previous regulations, the deaf and hard-of-hearing viewers who were legally deaf had been exempt. However, they started to contribute in 2013 in spite of relatively few hours of TV programming with closed-captioning. Sign Dialog, the working group of German Association of the Deaf, has nominated that they are more willing to pay the full rate once the milestone of 100% closed-captioning programming has been reached.

In August 2021, the fee was raised from €17.50 per month to €18.36 per month.

License fee revenues and administrative costs
In 2010, the GEZ collected €7.65 billion in licence fees for state broadcasting institutions. Collection costs amounted to €160.5 million, which is about 2.13% of total revenue or €3.83 per participant. Additional costs are generated in the state broadcasting institutions by the so-called  (commissioner services), those expenditures for licence fee collection amounted to €184.97 million in 2007, according to the ARD 2008 yearbook.

According to its 2010 annual report, the GEZ employed 1,148 people. According to its website, the  still employs around 1,000 people.

In 2016 the total sum of licence fees collected amounted to €7,978,041,425.77 thereof a revenue for  itself of €167,954,892.36.

Elicitation and storage of data
The state broadcasting institutions, and the GEZ respectively, are allowed to store and administer all the fee payer data which is necessary to perform their tasks. The Federal Statistical Office of Germany counts 39 million private households, while the GEZ in 2004 held 41.2 million data sets of fee payers. These include 2.2 million data sets of fee payers who de-registered ownership of devices which can receive radio/television. GEZ had one of the most comprehensive databases on the population of the Federal Republic of Germany.

In 2002, German registration authorities transferred over 12 million data sets to the GEZ.

To identify non-payers, the GEZ adjusted their database with data sets purchased from commercial address vendors.

Resistance 
There are cases of some regional courts of law ruling against the legality of the foreclosures (forced seizure of property, e.g. directly from bank account registered with the tax office or from the paycheck directly with the employing entity) to cover for the amount of due contribution (not tax), on the ground of the seizing organism being private and not part of the state.

There has been multiple cases of citizens being jailed for not paying the tax. One was later released after the charges were dropped due to criticism from both public and private media.

References

External links 

  

ARD (broadcaster)
ZDF
Radio stations in Germany
Collection agencies
Mass media in Cologne
Organisations based in Cologne
Organizations established in 1976
1976 establishments in West Germany